Xuling may refer to:

 Xuling, Anhui (许岭镇), China
 Xuling, Liaoning (徐岭镇), town in Zhuanghe, Liaoning, China